Wally Clark may refer to:

 Wally Clark (Australian footballer) (born 1936), Australian rules footballer
 Wally Clark (English footballer) (1896–1975), English association football (soccer) forward
 Wally Clark (zoologist) (1927–2019), New Zealand zoologist

See also
 Wallace Clark (1926–2011), Northern Irish sailor and writer
 Walter Clark (disambiguation)